Dorien is a Spanish psychological thriller and horror web television series created by Kiko and Javier Prada starring Carolina Bang, Daniel Muriel, Macarena Gómez and Dafne Fernández. It was released from 2017 to 2018 on RTVE's playz.

Premise 
Consisting of a loose translation to the current day and age of Oscar Wilde's The Picture of Dorian Gray, the fiction is set in Malasaña, Madrid.

Dorien (Carolina Bang) is a popular photographer obsessed with not aging who is hired by influencers. A disgruntled journalist, Marcos (Daniel Muriel), is commissioned to write a report about Dorien, unaware that the latter's camera takes away the essence and youth of the people. Dorien has even kept her secret away from her girlfriend Miriam (Dafne Fernández). Meanwhile, Marcos' relationship with her long-time girlfriend Marta (Macarena Gómez) is not going well.

Cast 
Starring
 Carolina Bang as Dorien.
  as Marcos.
 Macarena Gómez as Marta.
 Dafne Fernández as Miriam (special collaboration).
Other
 Eduardo Casanova
 Javier Botet
 
 Ana Rujas
 Jimmy Shaw
 Nacho Braun

Production and release 
Produced by The Other Side Films together with RTVE, filming started by July 2017 in Madrid. The series consisted of five 20-minute episodes.

The pilot became available online on 30 October 2017, on the occasion of the launch of the RTVE's playz platform. The two first episodes were released on playz on 16 January 2018. The series was created and directed by the (twin) brothers Kiko and Javi Prada, who also co-wrote the screenplay together with Alberto López and Helena Morales.

Macarena Gómez's performance was awarded a recognition in the category 'Best Actress' at the fifth edition of the Festival Carballo Interplay in 2018.

References 

2017 Spanish television series debuts
2018 Spanish television series endings
Playz original programming
2010s Spanish drama television series
Spanish horror fiction television series
Psychological thriller television series
2010s horror television series
Television shows set in Madrid
Television shows filmed in Spain
Spanish television miniseries
Spanish-language television shows